Petri Nets, the International Conference on Applications and Theory of Petri Nets and Concurrency is an academic conference organized annually by the Petri net community. The conference was first organized in 1980 Strasbourg, France

Since then the conference has been organized annually. The Petri Nets Steering Committee is responsible for the conference, including selection of organisers, PC members, invited speakers, tutorials and workshops, etc.

History 

 1980 Strasbourg, France
 1981 Bad Honnef, Germany
 1982 Varenna, Italy
 1983 Toulouse, France
 1984 Aarhus, Denmark
 1985 Espoo, Finland
 1986 Oxford, UK
 1987 Zaragoza, Spain
 1988 Venice, Italy
 1989 Bonn, Germany
 1990 Paris, France
 1991 Aarhus, Denmark
 1992 Sheffield, UK	
 1993 Chicago, USA
 1994 Zaragoza, Spain
 1995 Torino, Italy
 1996 Osaka, Japan
 1997 Toulouse, France
 1998 Lisbon, Portugal
 1999 Williamsburg, USA
 2000 Aarhus, Denmark
 2001 Newcastle upon Tyne, UK
 2002 Adelaide, Australia
 2003 Eindhoven, The Netherlands
 2004 Bologna, Italy
 2005 Miami, USA
 2006 Turku, Finland
 2007 Siedlce, Poland
 2008 Xi'an, China
 2009 Paris, France
 2010 Braga, Portugal
 2011 Newcastle upon Tyne, UK
 2012 Hamburg, Germany
 2013 Milano, Italy
 2014 Tunis, Tunisia
 2015 Brussels, Belgium
 2016 Toruń, Poland
 2017 Zaragoza, Spain
 2018 Bratislava, Slovakia
 2019 Aachen, Germany
 2020 Paris (online), France
 2021 Paris, France

See also 
 The list of computer science conferences contains other academic conferences in computer science.
 The topics of the conference cover the field of theoretical computer science.

References

External links 
 Petri Nets World
 Petri Nets Steering Committee
 38th Annual International Petri Nets Conference, Zaragoza, Spain, June 2017
 40th Annual International Petri Nets Conference, Aachen, Germany, June 2019
 42nd Annual International Petri Nets Conference, Paris, France, June 2020
 LNCS Transactions on Petri Nets and Other Models of Concurrency (ToPNoC)

Theoretical computer science conferences
Recurring events established in 1980